Midterm elections in the United States are the general elections that are held near the midpoint of a president's four-year term of office, on Election Day on the Tuesday after the first Monday in November. Federal offices that are up for election during the midterms include all 435 seats in the United States House of Representatives, and 33 or 34 of the 100 seats in the United States Senate.

In addition, 34 of the 50 U.S. states elect their governors for four-year terms during midterm elections, while Vermont and New Hampshire elect governors to two-year terms in both midterm and presidential elections. Thus, 36 governors are elected during midterm elections. Many states also elect officers to their state legislatures in midterm years. There are also elections held at the municipal level. On the ballot are many mayors, other local public offices, and a wide variety of citizen initiatives.

Special elections are often held in conjunction with regular elections, so additional Senators, governors and other local officials may be elected to partial terms.

Midterm elections historically generate lower voter turnout than presidential elections. While the latter have had turnouts of about 50–60% over the past 60 years, only about 40% of those eligible to vote go to the polls in midterm elections. Historically, midterm elections often see the president's party lose seats in Congress, and also frequently see the president's opposite-party opponents gain control of one or both houses of Congress.

Background
While Article II, Section 1, Clause 1 of the United States Constitution sets the U.S. President's term of office to four years, Article I, Section 2, Clause 1 sets a two-year term for congressmembers elected to the U.S. House of Representatives. Article I, Section 3, Clause 1 then sets a six-year term for those elected to the U.S. Senate, with Clause 2 dividing the chamber into three "classes" so that approximately one-third of those seats are up for election every two years.

The elections for many state and local government offices are held during the midterms so they are not overshadowed or influenced by the presidential election. Still, a number of state and local governments instead prefer to avoid presidential and midterm years altogether and schedule their local races during odd-numbered "off-years".

Historical record of midterm

Midterm elections are regarded as a referendum on the sitting president's and/or incumbent party's performance.

The party of the incumbent president tends to lose ground during midterm elections: since World War II, the President's party has lost an average of 26 seats in the House, and an average of four seats in the Senate.

Moreover, since direct public midterm elections were introduced, in only eight of those (under presidents Woodrow Wilson, Franklin D. Roosevelt, John F. Kennedy, Richard Nixon, Bill Clinton,  George W. Bush, Donald Trump, and Joe Biden) has the President's party gained seats in the House or the Senate, and of those only two (1934, Franklin D. Roosevelt, and 2002, George  W. Bush) have seen the President's party gain seats in both houses.

The losses suffered during a president's second midterm tend to be more pronounced than during their first midterm, in what is described as a "six-year itch".

Comparison with other U.S. general elections

Notes

References

External links
 

Elections in the United States
1790 establishments in the United States